The Lagos Marathon is a silver label marathon held annually in :Lagos, Nigeria.

Overview
The origins of the event trace back to 1983 when the first ever Lagos international marathon took place. The Lagos International Marathon is organized by the Athletic Federation of Nigeria and was preceded by several recurring half marathons held in the city where athletes like John Cheruiyot Korir,
Paul Malakwen Kosgei and Dieudonné Disi emerged as winners. The Marathon course which spans a distance of about 42 km,  starts at National Stadium, Surulere, Lagos, (where previous half marathons initially finished), continues along the Third Mainland Bridge, to the Lekki-Ikoyi link bridge and finishes at Eko Atlantic.

2016
Over 20,000 athletes competed on 6 February 2016 event which was sponsored by Access Bank. The marathon course record was held by a Kenyan national,  Abraham Kiptum who completed the race in  2 hours, 16 minutes and 21 seconds. The fastest woman was an Ethiopian national Halima Hussein Kayo, who ran a time of 2 hours, 38 minutes and 36 seconds.

2017
Kenyan national Abraham Kiptum defended his title, finishing the race in 2 hours 15 minutes 20 seconds while his female compatriot Rodah Jepkori Tanuyi emerged as the first-place winner in the women's category.

2018
In the event of 10 February 2018; French-Kenyan national Abraham Kiprotich finished the race while setting a new record time of 2:13:04 hours in the men's category while Ethiopian national Alemenesh Herpha Guta came first in the women's category.

A 10 km Family Race starting at Lekki Roundabout to Eko Atlantic was introduced in the 2018 edition to encourage participation from non professional runners for fitness, fun and health purposes.

2019
Out of about 100, 000 competitors in the 2019 edition which held on Saturday, 2 February, Ethiopian national, Sintayehu Legese won the race in a finishing time of 2 hours 17 minutes 28 seconds in the men's category. His female compatriot Dinke Meserete finished first in the women's category.

2020

The 42 km race commenced from National Stadium, Surulere, Lagos and ended at Eko Atlantic, Lagos. Both male and female 42 km runners competed for the grand prize of $50,000 while the second and third-place winners $40,000 and $30,000 respectively.

The race ended with Kenyan Olympian David Barmasai winning with a course record of 2:10:00 (Unofficial) who went home with a whopping $70,000, and another Kenyan Sharon Cherop was the first female to touch the finish line.

Winners
Key:

2020 Edition

References

External links

Marathons in Nigeria
Annual events in Lagos
Annual sporting events in Nigeria
Recurring sporting events established in 1983
1983 establishments in Nigeria
International sports competitions in Lagos